The Bourbre is a  long river in the Isère and Rhône departments in central eastern France. Its source is in Burcin. It flows generally north-northwest. It is a left tributary of the Rhône, into which it flows at Chavanoz.

Departments and communes along its course
This list is ordered from source to mouth: 
Isère: Burcin, Châbons, Virieu, Blandin, Panissage, Chélieu, Chassignieu, Le Passage, Saint-Ondras, Saint-André-le-Gaz, Les Abrets-en-Dauphiné, La Bâtie-Montgascon, Saint-Didier-de-la-Tour, Saint-Clair-de-la-Tour, La Tour-du-Pin, Saint-Jean-de-Soudain, Rochetoirin, Cessieu, Sérézin-de-la-Tour, Ruy, Nivolas-Vermelle, Bourgoin-Jallieu, L'Isle-d'Abeau, Vaulx-Milieu, Villefontaine, La Verpillière, Saint-Quentin-Fallavier, Chamagnieu, Satolas-et-Bonce 
Rhône: Colombier-Saugnieu
Isère: Tignieu-Jameyzieu, Charvieu-Chavagneux, Pont-de-Chéruy, Chavanoz,

References

Rivers of France
Rivers of Auvergne-Rhône-Alpes
Rivers of Isère
Rivers of Rhône (department)